Urazovo (Uraź) is a rural locality (a selo) and the administrative centre of Urazovsky Selsoviet, Uchalinsky District, Bashkortostan, Russia. The population was 1,051 as of 2010. There are 19 streets.

Geography 
Urazovo is located 22 km southwest of Uchaly (the district's administrative centre) by road.

References 

Rural localities in Uchalinsky District